Opium is a plant latex that is a source of narcotic analgesic drugs

Opium may also refer to:
 Afyonkarahisar, Turkish city formerly known as Afyon (Opium)
 Opium poppy, the plant from which opium is obtained
 Opium (perfume)

Film
 Opium (1919 film), a 1919 German film
 Opium (1949 film), a 1949 Mexican crime film
 Opium: Diary of a Madwoman, a 2007 Hungarian film

Music
 Opium (KMFDM album), 1984
 Opium (Ottmar Liebert album), 1996
 Opium (Bill Dixon, Franz Koglmann, and Steve Lacy album), 2001
 Opium (Matt Berry album), 2008
 Opium (Jay-Jay Johanson album)
 Opium, a 1995 album by Russian rock band Agatha Christie
 "Opium" (Moonspell song), 1996
 "Opium" (Serebro song), 2008
 "Opium", a song by Marcy Playground on their 1997 self-titled album
 "Opium", a song by moe. on their 2001 album Dither
 ”Opium”, a record label founded by American rapper Playboi Carti

Literature
 Opium, a fictional country situated between Aztlán, Mexico and the United States in Nancy Farmer's novel The House of the Scorpion (2002)
 Opium, graphic novel by the Spanish comic book artist Daniel Torres
 "Opium", a 1980 short story by Harlan Ellison

See also
 Opiates, drugs derived from opium
 Opioids, drugs similar to opiates